Spring Mill may refer to:

 Spring Mill (Batesville, Arkansas), an historic industrial property
 Spring Mill State Park, Indiana
 Spring Mill, Kentucky, a town
 Dawlis Mill-Spring Mill Historic District, East Amwell, NJ, listed on the NRHP in New Jersey
 Spring Mill, New Jersey
 Spring Mill, Pennsylvania, a community in Whitemarsh Township, Pennsylvania
 Spring Mill (SEPTA station), a suburban commuter railroad station
 Spring Mill Complex, Devault, Pennsylvania, a historic grist mill complex

See also 
 Spring Mills (disambiguation)